The men's 400 metres hurdles event at the 1971 Pan American Games was held in Cali on 2 and 3 August.

Medalists

Results

Heats

Final

References

Athletics at the 1971 Pan American Games
1971